Amazon Lab126 (sometimes known as Lab126) is an American research and development and computer hardware company owned by Amazon.com. It was founded in 2004 by Gregg Zehr, previously Vice President of Hardware Engineering at Palm, and is based in Sunnyvale, California. It is widely known for developing Amazon's Kindle line of e-readers and tablets.

Name 

Lab126's name derives from the arrow in Amazon's logo, which points from A to Z—the 1st and 26th letters in the English language alphabet.

Products 

In 2007, after three years of research and development by Lab126, the Amazon Kindle e-reader was released. Newer models of the Kindle continue to be released, with the latest model called the Kindle Oasis in mid-2016.
In 2011, Lab126 released the Kindle Fire tablet and in 2012 released two new models of the Fire tablet called the Kindle Fire HD. In 2013, it released the Fire HDX, a high-end tablet.
In 2014, Lab126 released the Amazon Fire TV digital media player and in late 2014 released the smaller Fire TV Stick.
In 2014, Lab126 released the Fire Phone that was not commercially successful.
In 2015, Lab126 released the Amazon Echo, a voice command device.
In 2016, it released the Echo Dot, which is a hockey puck sized version of the Echo and the Amazon Tap, a smaller, portable version of the Echo.
In 2021, it announced Amazon Astro, a brand of domestic robots developed by Lab126.

References

External links 
 Lab 126 -- Public Website

2004 establishments in California
Amazon (company)
Companies based in Sunnyvale, California
Computer companies established in 2004
Technology companies established in 2004
Electronics companies of the United States
Technology companies based in the San Francisco Bay Area
Research and development in the United States